Deering Center is a neighborhood in the residential area of Portland, Maine, United States.

Deering Center runs from Brighton Avenue to Forest Avenue to Catherine McAuley High School near Wayside Street on Ludlow Street.

History
Formerly known as the town of Deering, Maine (named for Capt. James Deering, horse farmer and early resident of Deering), which separated from Westbrook in 1871. It was incorporated into Portland as Deering Center on March 9, 1899. 

Neighborhoods located within the larger neighborhood include North Deering and East Deering.

Education 
Several schools are located in Deering Center:

 Deering High School
 Lincoln Middle School
 Henry Wadsworth Longfellow Elementary School
 Catherine McAuley High School (Changing its name soon due to legal issues)
 Roots N Shoots Nature Based Preschool
 The University of New England's Portland campus (formerly Westbrook College) (Not in Deering Center but borders it to the North)
 Maplewood Montessori School (No longer in business)

Notable people
Francis Ormand Jonathan Smith, U.S. Congressman
John B. Curtis, businessman, chewing gum developer
Scott Wilson (judge) served on United States Court of Appeals for the First Circuit

References

Neighborhoods in Portland, Maine